Mungungo is a rural town and locality in the North Burnett Region, Queensland, Australia.

Geography

History
The name Mungungo is believed to mean "darkness" or "night" in an unidentified Aboriginal language. Until 1929, the town was known as Waratah.

The Mungungo Hall (also known as School of Arts) was officially opened with a dance on Saturday 13 July 1929.  celebrated its 90th birthday in 2019.

The now-abandoned Gladstone to Monto railway line reached Mungungo in 1930 with two now-abandonded stations in the locality:

 Crana railway station
 Mungungo railway station

Education 
There are no schools in Mungungo. The nearest government primary and secondary schools are Monto State School and Monto State High School, both in neighbouring Monto to the south.

Amenities

Mungungo is well known for its pub which is one of the few available eateries in the area.

Mungungo Public Hall is at 14 Harris Street.

Attractions

The Bicentennial National Trail passes through Mungungo.

References

External links

 

Towns in Queensland
Localities in Queensland
North Burnett Region